That's My Jam is an American music game show. Hosted by Jimmy Fallon, the series is based on the music-themed segments of The Tonight Show Starring Jimmy Fallon. It premiered on NBC with a preview episode on November 29, 2021, ahead of its timeslot premiere on January 3, 2022. In February 2022, the series was renewed for a second season.

Production 
On March 13, 2019, it was announced that NBC had made a 10-episode order for That's My Jam, a variety game show which would feature celebrities competing in music-themed challenges inspired by those seen on its late-night talk show The Tonight Show Starring Jimmy Fallon. On January 11, 2020, it was announced that Fallon would host the series (marking his first primetime series for NBC), which was slated to premiere after the closing ceremonies of the 2020 Summer Olympics. However due to the COVID-19 pandemic, the Olympics were postponed to 2021, while NBC slated different programming to air after the closing ceremonies instead.

On October 28, 2021, it was announced that the series would premiere on January 3, 2022 as part of NBC's midseason lineup, with a special preview episode airing on November 29 featuring Kelly Clarkson, Ariana Grande, John Legend, and Blake Shelton of The Voice.

On February 7, 2022, NBC renewed the series for a second season, which premiered on March 7, 2023.

Format 
The game features celebrity teams competing in music-themed challenges, some of which adapted from recurring segments on The Tonight Show, such as "Mixtape Medley Showdown", "Slay It, Don't Spray It", and "Wheel of Musical Impressions".

Episodes

Series overview

Season 1 (2021–22)

Special (2022)

Season 2 (2023)

Reception

Season 1

Season 2

Notes

International adaptations 
On December 7, 2021, NBC announced that it had sold the format to France's TF1, under the name Stéréo Club, hosted by Camille Combal. The series premiered on May 20, 2022.

On August 24, 2022, it was announced that a UK adaptation, hosted by Mo Gilligan and broadcast on BBC One, would be filmed entirely in Los Angeles. The series premiered on December 17, 2022 to poor reception.

On October 18, 2022, it was announced that adaptations were being developed for Spain, Portugal, Italy and Mongolia.

On February 9, 2023, it was announced that a German adaptation, hosted by Bill and Tom Kaulitz, would be broadcast on RTL+.

References

External links 
 
 

2020s American game shows
2020s American music television series
2020s American variety television series
2021 American television series debuts
American television spin-offs
English-language television shows
Musical game shows
NBC original programming
Television series by Universal Television
Television shows directed by Glenn Weiss
The Tonight Show Starring Jimmy Fallon